Numa, also known as Walkers Bluff or Walkerton, is an unincorporated community in Florida Township, Parke County, in the U.S. state of Indiana.

History
Numa was laid out in 1837. According to Ronald L. Baker, the community may be named after Numa Pompilius. A post office was established at Numa in 1844, and remained in operation until it was discontinued in 1889.

Geography

References

Unincorporated communities in Indiana
Unincorporated communities in Parke County, Indiana